Legion: XX is  a cover album by American heavy metal band Lamb of God, under their original name Burn the Priest. The album was released on May 18, 2018 through Epic Records/Nuclear Blast. It is the band's first album as Burn the Priest since their 1999 album. It is the last album to feature founding drummer Chris Adler before his departure from Lamb of God in July 2019.

Track listing

Personnel
Burn the Priest
 Chris Adler – drums
 Willie Adler – rhythm guitar
 Randy Blythe – vocals
 John Campbell – bass
Mark Morton – lead guitar

Production
 Josh Wilbur – producer, mixing, engineer
 Brad Blackwood – mastering
 Josh Brooks – mixing
 Kyle McAulay – mixing
 Lana Migliore – mixing
 Nick Rowe – mixing

Charts

References

2018 albums
Covers albums
Lamb of God (band) albums
Epic Records albums
Nuclear Blast albums